USS Fury may refer to the following ships of the United States Navy:

, the former Umpqua, only held the name for a few months in 1869
, Flower-class corvette, was commissioned 17 March 1942 and decommissioned 22 August 1945

United States Navy ship names